Tahiry Mosa is a Malagasy politician. He is a member of the Senate of Madagascar for Anosy.

References

Year of birth missing (living people)
Living people
Members of the Senate (Madagascar)
Place of birth missing (living people)
People from Anosy
21st-century Malagasy politicians